The Hammonds Saltaire Band, formerly also known as YBS Band, Yorkshire Building Society Band, and Hammonds Sauce Works Band is a brass band originating from Yorkshire.

History 
The name of the band has often changed as sponsorship changed. The band was formed in 1855 under the name of Saltaire Band. In 1946  the band was named Hammonds Sauce Band. In the early nineties Yorkshire Building Society started sponsoring the band and the name changed into Yorkshire Building Society Band. In 2004, however, the sponsorship ended and the band changed its name to YBS Band. There was a growing mood to change the name, and therefore the name was changed in January 2009 into "Hammonds Saltaire Band".

Honours 
Many prizes have been won by the band including:
 European Brass Band Championships. Winner in 1996, 1997, 1999, 2000, 2001, 2002, 2003 and 2004

Partial discography

References

External links

Musical groups from West Yorkshire
British brass bands